The quai André Citroën is a road and quai along the rive gauche of the  Seine, in the 15e arrondissement of Paris.

Formerly the quai de Javel, after the town of Javel formerly on the site (this developed in 1485 out of the village of Javetz and its small port and boat yard), it was renamed in honour of the car manufacturer André Citroën (1878–1935).

The Citroën factories operated here between 1915 and 1974 (on what is now the Parc André Citroën).

The quai's axis is largely north-east to south-west.  It continues in the north into quai de Grenelle, at pont de Grenelle, and to the south by quai d'Issy-les-Moulineaux at pont du Garigliano.  Pont Mirabeau also joins to the Quai André-Citroën.  The whole of this quai along the Seine is occupied by the port de Javel.

Notable sites 
 Front de Seine, a collection of 1970s skyscrapers
 Parc André Citroën
 The headquarters of France Télévision, on the extreme south end of the quai.

Notes and references

External links 
  Quai André Citroën on Google Earth

Andre-Citroen
Buildings and structures in the 15th arrondissement of Paris